Broomfields is a hamlet in Shropshire, England. It is located north of Montford Bridge and near to the hamlets of Forton Heath and Grafton. It is in the parish of Montford.

It used to have its own 7 1/4 gauge garden railway at Broomfields Villa called Broomfields Garden Railway (BGR) from the late 1980s until 2008 when the house was sold, a video can be seen here: https://www.youtube.com/watch?v=VLkMdJS7jho

Looking from Google Earth the trackbed around the field the track used to be is visible.

The railway was opened to the public a few times to raise money for the air ambulance.

More info about one of the model trains and a photo of it can be found here: GWR 1101 Class

See also
Listed buildings in Montford, Shropshire

Hamlets in Shropshire